William Lowthian Green (13 September 1819 – 7 December 1890) was an English adventurer and merchant who later became cabinet minister in the Kingdom of Hawaii. As an amateur geologist, he published a theory of the formation of the earth called the tetrahedral hypothesis.

Life
Green was born in Doughty Street in London on 13 September 1819. His mother, Mary Childs, was from the Lothian region of Scotland. His father, Joseph Green, was apprenticed to an early scientific instrument maker, Jesse Ramsden, and then started a successful merchandise business in northern England. His father was a distant relation to Charles Green, who was astronomer on James Cook's voyage of 1768.

Green was educated privately in Liverpool and at King William's College on the Isle of Man. As a young man continuing his father's business he sailed to Buenos Aires in Argentina. He crossed the Pampas plain and then the Andes mountains on horseback. By 1844 he returned to Liverpool, but by that time his father had died.

Adventure
His next venture was building one of the first screw steamships to reach South America from England. His small ship Flecha was not a business success, however. In 1849 he joined the California Gold Rush. By 1850 he had lost his fortune, and hired as a common sailor bound for China. He got as far as Honolulu in the Hawaiian Islands where Robert Cheshire Janion hired him into the firm of Starkey, Janion & Company. Green became a partner and the company was known as Janion, Green & Company. By 1851 he founded and became first president of a social club for British residents he called "The Mess". It was later renamed The Pacific Club.

After David M. Weston's Honolulu Iron Works building burned down, he took over the business in 1860 with Thomas Hughes. His company imported machinery from American factories for use in sugar plantations in Hawaii.
In Honolulu in January 1862 Green married Anna McKibben, daughter of Robert McKibben, a physician at the Queen's Hospital. They had a daughter, Mary E. Green, who married J. N. A. Williams, and a son who died young. Prior to this marriage, Green had two children, a daughter, Elizabeth K. Green, who married George Douglas Freeth, Sr., and a son, William Green, with a Hawaiian woman, Lapeka. Green left Janion around 1867, and the English investor Theophilus Harris Davies then had to travel from London to bail out the company. The company was renamed Theo H. Davies & Co., and Green went into business by himself.

Green served as acting British consul in 1859 after the health failed of both William Miller and his replacement Busvargus Toup Nicolas (1819–1859), and again between William W. F. Synge (1826–1891) and James H. Wodehouse.

Politics
On 17 February 1874, he was appointed minister of foreign affairs, replacing Charles Reed Bishop. A major milestone of his administration was ratifying the Reciprocity Treaty of 1875 with the United States on 17 June 1876, which was also signed by Ulysses S. Grant. It had been negotiated for a long time by Elisha Hunt Allen and Henry A. P. Carter.
He served until 5 December 1876, when Carter replaced him. He was appointed again as minister of foreign affairs on 22 September 1880, and served until 20 May 1882.
He filled in as acting minister of the interior from 28 May to 31 October 1874. At that time he was replaced by Walter M. Gibson.

After Gibson fell from power the 1887 Constitution of the Kingdom of Hawaii was imposed by force. This gave it the name "Bayonet Constitution". Green was told to form a new cabinet; he included Lorrin A. Thurston, a leader of the bloodless coup, as minister of interior. 
Green became minister of finance on 1 July 1887, and served until 22 July 1889 when his health started to fail.

Geology

Green was fascinated by the volcanoes in the Hawaiian islands. By 1855 he wrote a series of articles on local geology in the Sandwich Islands Monthly newspaper of Abraham Fornander. His ideas on the formation of the earth, based on the nebular hypothesis of Pierre-Simon Laplace, shocked the local conservatives who literally believed in creation according to Genesis.
In 1857 he published an article in the Edinburgh New Philosophical Journal based on the theory of Jean-Baptiste Élie de Beaumont. In 1859 he went on expeditions to view the erupting Mauna Loa and nearby Kīlauea and Hualālai on Hawaii island. He hosted the adventurer Isabella Bird when she came to visit, and gave her a tour of the volcanoes.

His first book on his tetrahedral hypothesis was published in 1875. It was "...a work which was neglected or ridiculed at the time of its appearance." The journal Nature published only a one-line notice for the book.
He published a second volume in 1887 concentrating on volcanic phenomena. This time the Nature journal published three sentences.

As his health failed he dictated a criticism of the work of James Dwight Dana. Green died at his home in Honolulu on 7 December 1890. 
His theory became more widely discussed into the first decades of the 20th century. For example, the French geologist Albert Auguste Cochon de Lapparent mentioned Green's work in his textbook.
The American geologist Charles Henry Hitchcock, in his own 1911 book on the Hawaiian volcanoes, said:
The memory of William Lowthian Green will be honored henceforth because of his success in showing why the Earth has assumed its present relief.
Théophile Moreux said observations "...point more and more to the truth of an old theory which was long ignored." In their textbooks, Archibald Geikie
and Arthur Holmes called the theory '"ingenious". But by the late 1920s Holmes was promoting theories of continental drift as proposed by Alfred Wegener, which evolved into concepts of plate tectonics. Modern theories view the current continental configurations as only transitory, so give no special role to the tetrahedral shape. However, they do attribute a large influence to volcanic activity as he suggested.

Works
 
 
 
   Letter to William T. Brigham
   Letter to Sir John Lubbock

See also
 Hawaii hotspot
 Evolution of Hawaiian volcanoes
 List of bilateral treaties signed by the Kingdom of Hawaii

References

1819 births
1890 deaths
People from Holborn
Hawaiian Kingdom politicians
Members of the Hawaiian Kingdom Privy Council
Hawaiian Kingdom Foreign Ministers
Members of the Hawaiian Kingdom House of Nobles
Hawaiian Kingdom Interior Ministers
Hawaiian Kingdom Finance Ministers
Businesspeople from Hawaii
Writers from Hawaii
People educated at King William's College
Ambassadors of the United Kingdom to Hawaii
19th-century American businesspeople
19th-century British businesspeople